Darcy Macpherson (born 29 October 1997) is an Australian rules footballer playing for the Gold Coast Football Club in the Australian Football League (AFL). He is the son of former  player, Stephen Macpherson. He was drafted by the Gold Coast Football Club with their second selection and twenty-first overall in the 2016 rookie draft. He made his debut in the seventy-three point loss against  in round 7, 2016 at Metricon Stadium.

Statistics
 Statistics are correct to the end of round 3, 2022

|- style="background-color: #EAEAEA"
! scope="row" style="text-align:center" | 2016
|
| 44 || 4 || 2 || 2 || 24 || 23 || 47 || 8 || 22 || 0.5 || 0.5 || 6.0 || 5.8 || 11.8 || 2.0 || 5.5
|-
! scope="row" style="text-align:center" | 2017
|
| 44 || 8 || 3 || 3 || 47 || 47 || 94 || 27 || 25 || 0.4 || 0.4 || 5.9 || 5.9 || 11.8 || 3.4 || 3.1
|- style="background-color: #EAEAEA"
! scope="row" style="text-align:center" | 2018
|
| 44 || 5 || 4 || 2 || 54 || 16 || 70 || 16 || 27 || 0.8 || 0.4 || 10.8 || 3.2 || 14.0 || 3.2 || 5.4
|-
! scope="row" style="text-align:center" | 2019
|
| 44 || 22 || 12 || 9 || 262 || 149 || 411 || 91 || 134 || 0.5 || 0.4 || 11.9 || 6.8 || 18.7 || 4.1 || 6.1
|- style="background-color: #EAEAEA"
! scope="row" style="text-align:center" | 2020
|
| 44 || 12 || 4 || 0 || 80 || 58 || 138 || 26 || 33 || 0.3 || 0.0 || 6.7 || 4.8 || 11.5 || 2.2 || 2.8
|-
! scope="row" style="text-align:center" | 2021
|
| 44 || 11 || 1 || 6 || 98 || 60 || 158 || 48 || 43 || 0.1 || 0.5 || 8.9 || 5.5 || 14.4 || 4.4 || 3.9
|- style="background-color: #EAEAEA"
! scope="row" style="text-align:center" | 2022
|
| 44 || 2 || 0 || 0 || 5 || 9 || 14 || 2 || 1 || 0.0 || 0.0 || 2.5 || 4.5 || 7.0 || 1.0 || 0.5
|- class="sortbottom"
! colspan=3| Career
! 64
! 26
! 22
! 570
! 362
! 932
! 218
! 285
! 0.4
! 0.3
! 8.9
! 5.7
! 14.6
! 3.4
! 4.5
|}

References

External links

1997 births
Living people
Gold Coast Football Club players
Northern Knights players
Australian rules footballers from Victoria (Australia)